The midwestern worm snake, Carphophis amoenus helenae, a subspecies of C. amoenus, is a nonvenomous snake in the family  Colubridae. The subspecies is endemic to the Midwest and Southern United States.

Etymology
The subspecific name, helenae, is in honor of "Miss Helen Tennison", a misspelling of the name of Robert Kennicott's cousin Helen L. Teunisson. Tenuisson collected specimens for and with Kennicott in Mississippi.

Common names
Additional common names for C. a. helenae include central twig snake, central worm snake, ground snake, Helen's snake, Helen Tennison's snake, Helen's worm snake, red snake, and worm snake.

Geographic range
The subspecies C. a. helenae ranges from southern Ohio to northern Georgia in the east and from southern Illinois to eastern Louisiana in the west.

Description
It is plain dark brown on top and light pink on its underside.

The scalation on the anterior dorsal surface of the head is distinctive. Instead of having a pair of internasals and a pair of prefrontals, as are found in most snakes including other subspecies of C. amoenus, the midwestern worm snake has each internasal fused with its corresponding prefrontal. As a result, in the space between the rostral and the frontal, C. a. helenae has two large head shields, one on the left and one on the right, instead of the usual four smaller shields.

Behavior, diet, and habitat
The midwestern worm snake is fossorial.  It spends its life burrowing in moist soil or under the leaf litter searching for soft-bodied prey, with a preference for earthworms.
This secretive snake prefers mesic deciduous forest.

References

Further reading
Behler JL, King FW (1979). The Audubon Society Field Guide to North American Reptiles and Amphibians. New York: Alfred A. Knopf. 743 pp., 657 plates. . (Carphophis amoenus helenae, p. 592).
Conant R, Bridges W (1939). What Snake Is That? A Field Guide to the Snakes of the United States East of the Rocky Mountains. (With 108 Drawings by Edmond Malnate). New York and London: D. Appleton-Century Company. Frontispiece map + viii + 163 pp. + Plates A-C, 1-32. (Carphophis amoena helenae, p. 31 + Plate 2, figure 5A).
Kennicott R (1859). "Notes on Coluber calligaster of Say, and a description of new species of Serpents in the collection of the North Western University of Evanston, Ill[inois]". Proc. Acad. Nat. Sci. Philadelphia [11]: 98-100. (Celuta helenæ, new species, p. 100).
Powell R, Conant R, Collins JT (2016). Peterson Field Guide to Reptiles and Amphibians of Eastern and Central North America, Fourth Edition. Boston and New York: Houghton Mifflin Harcourt. xiv + 494 pp., 47 plates, 207 figures. . (Carphophis amoenus helenae, pp. 401-402, Figure 186).
Schmidt KP, Davis DD (1941). Field Book of Snakes of the United States and Canada. New York: G.P. Putnam's Sons. 365 pp. (Carphophis amoena helenae, pp. 102-103).
Smith HM, Brodie ED Jr (1982). Reptiles of North America: A Guide to Field Identification. New York: Golden Press. 240 pp.  (paperback),  (hardcover). (Carphophis amoenus helenae, p. 162).

Carphophis
Reptiles of the United States
Fauna of the Southeastern United States